Ieva Bērziņa (born 19 November 1967 in Riga) is a Latvian female curler.

At the national level, she is a two-time Latvian women's champion (2013, 2014).

Teams

Women's

Mixed

Mixed doubles

References

External links

Video: 

Living people
1967 births
Sportspeople from Riga
Latvian female curlers
Latvian curling champions
21st-century Latvian women